Jorhat Airport , also known as Rowriah Airport, is a domestic airport serving the cities of Jorhat and Golaghat in Assam, India.

History
It was established in early 1950s and commonly known as Rowriah Airport because it is located at Rowriah area of the city. Jorhat AFS is the Indian Air Force's first air base in the East. It is primarily a transport base for launching aircraft that carry out airdrops in the Naga Hills in Nagaland and Arunachal Pradesh.

It is equipped with two squadrons of An-32 transport aircraft and air logistics are provided from Jorhat to the Kameng, Subansiri, Siang, Lohit and Tirap districts of Arunachal Pradesh.

Expansion
On 8 February 2022, the Government of Assam approved the sanction of ₹ 156 crore for the acquisition of private land to facilitate the expansion of the airport.

Airlines and destinations

Statistics

References

External links
 Jorhat Airport at the AAI

Indian Air Force
Transport in Jorhat
Airports in Assam
Airports established in the 1950s
1950s establishments in Assam
Airports with year of establishment missing
20th-century architecture in India